The Montijo Building is an historic structure located at 554 5th Avenue in San Diego's Gaslamp Quarter, in the U.S. state of California. It was built in 1895.

See also
 List of Gaslamp Quarter historic buildings

References

External links

 

1895 establishments in California
Buildings and structures completed in 1895
Buildings and structures in San Diego
Gaslamp Quarter, San Diego